The Pentaport Residence Tower or Asan SK Pentaport Residential Tower 2, commonly shortened to Pentaport (Korean: 펜타포트) is a skyscraper in Cheonan-si, South Korea whose construction was completed in 2008. Standing at 166m it is the tallest skyscraper in Chungcheongnam-do, 30th tallest skyscraper in Korea, and 274th tallest building in the world.

Pentaport in media
It was seen in Fabricated City in 2017.

References

Residential skyscrapers in South Korea
Buildings and structures in Cheonan
Buildings and structures completed in 2011